Bratucice  is a village in southern Poland, in the administrative district of Gmina Rzezawa within Bochnia County, Lesser Poland Voivodeship.

References

Bratucice